Ashok Kumar Yadav is an Indian politician.

Ashok Kumar Yadav may also refer to:

 Ashok Kumar Yadav (Sarlahi politician), a Nepalese politician from Kabilasi, Sarlahi
 Ashok Kumar Yadav (Siraha politician), a Nepalese politician from Sakhuwanankarkatti Rural Municipality